Denise Hsien Wu (吳嫻) is a professor of neuroscience, the head of the Concept & Language Laboratory, and the chair of the Institute of Cognitive Neuroscience at National Central University, Taiwan.

Early life and education 
Wu studied a B.S. in psychology at National Taiwan University, followed by an M.S. in psychology at National Chung Cheng University. She then moved to Rice University for her Ph.D. in psychology, with a specialty in cognitive neuroscience. After earning her Ph.D., Wu joined Anjan Chatterjee's group as a postdoctoral research fellow at the University of Pennsylvania.

Research 

Research area

 Patients with aphasic and amnesic traumatic brain injury study
 Cognitive representation in action, conception, and language
 Mental representation and processing of short-term memory
 Mental Characterization of parallel information processing
 Phonological processing in Chinese character identification
 Applications of fMRI in Cognitive Neuroscience

Selected awards 

 2013–2017 Outstanding Research Award, National Central University, Taiwan（中央大學101-105學年度學術研究傑出獎）
 2016 Fellow of the Association for Psychological Science, USA
 2015 Fellow of the Psychonomic Society, USA
 2014 TWAS Young Affiliate, The Academy of Sciences for the Developing World, East and Southeast Asia and Pacific Region
 2013 Distinguished Research Award, National Science Council, Taiwan（國科會優秀年輕學者研究計畫）
 2007, 2012 Excellent Teaching Award, the College of Science, National Central University（中央大學理學院優良教師）
 2012 Junior Research Investigators Award, Academia Sinica（中央研究院年輕學者研究著作獎）
 2011 Excellent Teaching Award, the College of Electrical Engineering and Computer Science, National Central University（中央大學資電學院優良教師）
 2009 Excellent Mentor Award, National Central University（中央大學優良導師）
 2007 Young Investigator Merit Award, National Science Council（國科會傑出學者養成計畫）

Selected publications 

 Rueckl, J. G., Paz-Alonso, P. M., Molfese, P. J., Kuo, W.-J., Bick, A., Frost, S. J., Hancock, R., Wu, D. H., Mencl, W. E., Dunabeitia, J. A., Lee, J.-R., Oliver, M., Zevin, J. D., Hoeft, F., Carreiras, M., Tzeng, O. J.-L., Pugh, K. R., & Frost, R. (2015). Universal brain signature of proficient reading: Evidence from four contrasting languages. Proceedings of the National Academy of Sciences, 112(50), 15510–15515. doi: 10.1073/pnas.1509321112 
 Hung, Y.-H., Pallier, C., Dehaene, S., Lin, Y.-C., Chang, A., Tzeng, O. J.-L., & Wu, D. H.* (2015). Neural correlates of merging number words. NeuroImage, 122, 33–43. doi: 10.1016/j.neuroimage

Science outreach 
Wu has been active on science outreach, including giving talks at the TED (conference) in Taipei and at the Tech-Talk FORUM of Scientific American. She also wrote articles for the Scientific American.

References 

Living people
Women neuroscientists
Taiwanese women academics
Taiwanese women scientists
Taiwanese neuroscientists
Academic staff of the National Central University
National Taiwan University alumni
Rice University alumni
Year of birth missing (living people)